Windsor F.C. may refer to:
Windsor F.C. (2011), currently active English football club
Windsor F.C. (1882), English football club active from 1882 to 1890
Windsor FC (Australia), Australian football club

See also
Windsor & Eton F.C., an English football club from 1892 to 2011
Windsor City FC, a Canadian soccer club